Coming to Terms with the Dead is a 1994 French drama film directed by Pascale Ferran. It won the Caméra d'Or at the 1994 Cannes Film Festival.

Cast 
 Didier Sandre as Vincent
 Alexandre Zloto as young Vincent 
 Catherine Ferran as Zaza
 Agathe De Chassey as young Zaza 
 Audrey Boitel as Lili
 Charles Berling as François
 Mathieu Robinot as young François 
 Didier Bezace as Rene
 Nadia Barentin as  The mother
 Jean Dautremay as The father
 Guillaume Charras as Jumbo
 Danièle Douet as Jumbo's mother
 Bruno Todeschini as Jumbo's father
 Guillaume Raynal as Bruno
 Dominique Constanza as Bruno's mother
 Alain Pralon as Dr. Le Bihan
 Emmanuelle Bach as The journalist
 Marc Betton as Zaza's doctor
 Jean Pélégri as an old man 
 Muriel Mayette as Zaza's colleague

References

External links 
 

1994 films
1994 drama films
1990s French-language films
French drama films
Films directed by Pascale Ferran
Pan-Européenne films
Caméra d'Or winners
1994 directorial debut films
1990s French films